Company of Strangers is the first and only studio album by Australian supergroup Company of Strangers. The album was recorded in 1992, and first released in Australia in December 1992.  It peaked at number 9 on the ARIA Charts and was certified gold.

Simon Hussey won the ARIA Award for Producer of the year for his work on this album at the ARIA Music Awards of 1993. The album was also nominated for 'Breakthrough Artist' but lost to  "Ordinary Angels" by Frente!.

Track listing

Personnel
 Simon Hussey - keyboards, drums, bass synth, backing vocal
 Jef Scott - vocals (tracks 1,4,7,8,10,11,12,14,15), electric and acoustic guitars, drums, bass
 James Reyne - vocals (tracks 1,3,6,10,11), acoustic guitar
 Daryl Braithwaite - vocals (tracks 1,2,3,11)

Charts and certifications

Weekly charts

Year-end charts

Certifications

Trivia
 James Reyne recorded an acoustic version of "Daddy's Gonna Make You a Star" for his 2007 album Ghost Ships.
 "Motor City (I Get Lost)" appeared on Reyne's upcoming Live CD/DVD - One Night in Melbourne.
 "Should Have Known Better / Very Light Hell" is listed on the track listing as 14a and 14b, rather than simply 14.
 All tracks on the album cross-fade / over-lap with the following / previous track.

References

1992 albums
Company of Strangers (band) albums